James Darren Siddons (born 25 April 1964) is an Australian cricketer, renowned for his involvement in Sheffield Shield first-class cricket over a 16-year career. He initially played for Victoria, and later for South Australia. He is currently a professional cricket coach and the batting coaching advisor for the Bangladesh National Cricket Team.

Playing career
On 23 November 1997 he broke David Hookes' Shield run record of 9,364, going on to make 10,643 runs in 146 games. He is now the third highest run-scorer in the Shield's history, behind Darren Lehmann and Jamie Cox. He is considered by some to be one of the finest batsmen in Shield competition not to receive a regular international spot, having been given just one opportunity to represent Australia in a One Day International (ODI), in 1988, scoring 32. Siddons was selected as a reserve for the 1987 Cricket World Cup.

Siddons played two games for the Sydney Swans Australian rules football club in 1984.

Coaching career
On 28 October 2007 Siddons was named the coach of the Bangladesh national cricket team. He left Bangladesh when his contract expired after the end of the 2011 World Cup, in which the team failed to qualify for the quarter-finals. In June 2011, he was appointed as coach of the Wellington Firebirds in New Zealand. Currently he is serving as the batting coach for the Bangladesh national cricket team appointed by Bangladesh Cricket Board on a primary contract of two years starting from February 2022.

See also
 List of Victoria first-class cricketers

References

External links

1964 births
Living people
Sydney Swans players
South Australia cricketers
Victoria cricketers
Australia One Day International cricketers
Coaches of the Bangladesh national cricket team
Kensington cricketers
Australian rules footballers from Victoria (Australia)
Australian cricketers
Australian cricket coaches
Cricketers from Victoria (Australia)